Puducherry formerly known as Pondicherry is a Union Territory of India formed out of four exclaves of former French India (being its capital, hence also known informally as Pondichéry) and named after the largest Puducherry district.

Open places of worship

Notes

References

 

Churches in Puducherry
Puducherry-related lists
Puducherry